The 2021 W Series Spielberg round 2 was the second round of seven in the 2021 W Series, and took place at the Red Bull Ring in Austria on 3rd July 2021. The event was an undercard to the 2021 Formula One World Championship round at the same circuit.

Report

Background
The event was initially scheduled as the opening round of the season to be held at Circuit Paul Ricard in conjunction with the 2021 French Grand Prix, however amendments made to the 2021 Formula One calendar resulted in the change.

Alice Powell led the championship on 25 points, 7 points ahead of Sarah Moore.

Race

The 2019 championship protagonists shared the front row of the grid but Beitske Visser stalled on the line and gave polesitter Jamie Chadwick a free kick heading into turn 1. Bruna Tomaselli and Irina Sidorkova leapfrogged Emma Kimiläinen at the start to briefly give Veloce Racing a 1–2 before Sidorkova track-extended her way around the outside into 2nd. Visser's team-mate Ayla Ågren and Marta García also stalled on the line. Kimiläinen re-passed Tomaselli on lap 2 and the oldest driver in the field set after the youngest driver in the field.

Bunker Racing team-mates Fabienne Wohlwend and Sabré Cook were the beneficiaries of the three stallers, moving from the back third of the field (Cook not setting a time in qualifying after she spun into a gravel trap) up to a battle for 10th. The American relegated her Liechtensteiner team-mate out of the points, whilst Sarah Moore found herself in a battle with a Spanish rookie for the second consecutive weekend – once again holding off said driver, this time Nerea Martí. Their battle proved fairer than that of Puma team-mates Marta García and Gosia Rdest; the Spaniard recovering from her earlier stall caught her Polish stablemate at the mid-point of the race and spun her out at turn 4.

The podium places were running away from the rest of the field – fourth-placed Tomaselli did not have the pace of the top three and formed a train with Moore next in line, who capitalised on the Brazilian's woes passing her for fourth on the penultimate lap. There was further movement within that pack as Abbie Eaton passed Martí for sixth. Cook meanwhile was struggling with balance issues late in the piece, resulting in both her team-mate and a hard-charging Visser passing her to battle over P10. A tough race for Miki Koyama was effectively ended after a pit-stop for a flat-spotted tyre left her a lap down.

Chadwick cruised to her first victory of the season, with Sidorkova holding out the much faster Kimiläinen for the entire race to finish second in her second W Series race. It was daylight back to the next group of cars; Sarah Moore some sixteen seconds behind the Finn as a result of Tomaselli's issues. The previous weekend's winner Alice Powell had an anonymous race, starting 12th and finishing 8th ahead of Belén García and Wohlwend – the Liechtensteiner beating Visser to the last point by just over two tenths of a second.

Classification

Practice

Qualifying

 – Piria was given a 3-place grid penalty for causing a collision in the previous event.

Race

Championship standings

See also
 2021 Austrian Grand Prix

Notes

References

External links
 Official website
 Race replay

|- style="text-align:center"
|width="35%"|Previous race:
|width="30%"|W Series2021 season
|width="40%"|Next race:

W Series Spielberg 2
W Series Spielberg 2
Spielberg 2
W Series Spielberg 2